Tennis competitions at the 2003 Games of the Small States of Europe in Malta were held from June 3 to June 7 at the Marsa Sports Club in Marsa. The tournament took place on Hard courts.

Events

Men's singles

Women's singles

Men's doubles

 Men's Doubles Results

Women's doubles

References

2003 in tennis
2003 Games of the Small States of Europe
2003